Craugastor persimilis is a species of frog in the family Craugastoridae. It is found in the lowlands and premontane Atlantic slopes of central to southeastern Costa Rica.
Its natural habitats are lowland and premontane moist rainforest. It lives in leaf-litter and can persist in moderately disturbed areas, including plantations. It is an adaptable species that is not considered threatened, despite severe habitat fragmentation within its range.

References

persimilis
Endemic fauna of Costa Rica
Amphibians of Costa Rica
Amphibians described in 1926
Taxonomy articles created by Polbot